The Westchester Open is golf tournament organized by the Westchester Golf Association. It has been played annually since 1920 at member clubs in New York or Connecticut. It was considered a PGA Tour event in the 1920s and 1930s.

History 
In 1971, the 29-year-old amateur David Ragaini played the event. Ragaini was on the Yale Bulldogs golf team during his college years and was a three-time letter winner. However, when he entered the 1971 Westchester Open he hadn't played a competitive tournament since 1964 and been working as a commercial singer for most of his career. Playing against a number of well-known names, like current PGA Tour pro Don Massengale, former Masters champion Doug Ford, and elite amateur Dick Siderowf, Ragaini "stunned" his competition, taking the lead late. The result was still in doubt down the stretch but Ragaini "sank long putts to save pars on the final two holes" to win.

Winners

2016 Rob Labritz
2015 Daniel Balin
2014 David Pastore
2013 Colin McDade (amateur)
2012 Mike Ballo
2011 Greg Bisconti
2010 Daniel Balin
2009 Craig Thomas
2008 John Stoltz
2007 Tony Demaria
2006 Ron Philo
2005 John Nieporte
2004 Frank Bensel
2003 Dave Fusco
2002 Tom Sutter
2001 Dave Fusco
2000 Carl Alexander
1999 Bill Van Orman
1998 Bruce Zabriski
1997 Bruce Zabriski
1996 Ron McDougal
1995 Bruce Zabriski
1994 Delroy Cambridge
1993 Rick Vershure
1992 Bobby Heins
1991 Rick Vershure
1990 Bobby Heins
1989 Ron McDougal
1988 Bobby Heins
1987 Mike White
1986 Bill Britton
1985 Evan Schiller
1984 Bruce Douglass
1983 Bobby Heins
1982 Bobby Heins
1981 Bobby Heins
1980 Gene Borek
1979 John Gentile
1978 John Gentile
1977 Tom Joyce
1976 John Ruby
1975 John Gentile
1974 Kelley Moser
1973 John Gentile
1972 Don Massengale
1971 David Ragaini (amateur)
1970 John Buczek
1969 Mike Krak
1968 Denny Lyons (amateur)
1967 Roy Pace
1966 Frank Wharton
1965 Terry Wilcox
1964 Terry Wilcox
1963 Doug Ford
1962 Gil Cavanaugh and Roger Ginsberg (amateur)
1961 Doug Ford
1960 Claude Harmon
1959 Robert Watson
1958 Fred Annon
1957 Mickey Homa
1956 Mickey Homa
1955 Mickey Homa
1954 Herman Barron
1953 Claude Harmon
1952 Fred Annon
1951 Claude Harmon
1950 Claude Harmon
1949 Jack Patroni
1948 Tony Manero
1947 Claude Harmon
1946 Claude Harmon
1943–45 No tournament due to World War II
1942 Paul Runyan
1941 Mike Turnesa
1940 Ben Hogan
1939 Paul Runyan
1938 Frank Moore
1937 Frank Moore
1936 Paul Runyan
1935 Paul Runyan
1934 Paul Runyan
1933 Mike Turnesa
1932 Tony Manero
1931 Paul Runyan
1930 Willie Macfarlane
1929 Bobby Cruickshank
1928 Bill Mehlhorn
1927 Bobby Cruickshank
1926 Johnny Farrell
1925 Mike Brady
1924 Willie Macfarlane
1923 George McLean
1922 Willie Macfarlane
1921 Jack Dowling
1920 Tom Kerrigan

References

External links
Westchester Golf Association
List of winners

Former PGA Tour events
Golf in Connecticut
Golf in New York (state)
Sports competitions in Connecticut